Bjarni Haukur Þórsson (transcribed in English as Bjarni Haukur Thorsson; born April 20, 1971) is an Icelandic director, writer, producer, and actor. He is the founder and owner of Thorsson Productions Ltd., an intellectual property based operating company and live entertainment production studio that has developed and produced more than 40 theatrical and broadcasting productions in eight countries around the world since 1996.

Career
Bjarni is a well established director in Scandinavia; since starting out in 1996, he has directed numerous productions in several countries for both stage and screen. His productions have been nominated for 12 major theatre and television awards in Scandinavia. Bjarni graduated from the American Academy of Dramatic Arts in New York City in 1995, having previously attended New York University – Tisch School of the Arts.

Bjarni is the creator and co-star of the plays The DAD and The GRAND-DAD . He completed his MBA degree in May 2011 from Reykjavik University. He has written three stage plays and several television series so far.

Personal life

Bjarni is married to Karin Ida Thorsson; they have three sons, Haukur, William and Olaf Gustaf.

References

External links

1971 births
Living people
Bjarni Haukur Þórsson
Tisch School of the Arts alumni
Bjarni Haukur Þórsson
Bjarni Haukur Þórsson
Bjarni Haukur Þórsson
Bjarni Haukur Þórsson